Vanessa 'Nessy' Monaghan is an Irish radio presenter employed by RTÉ. She presents The London Ear on RTÉ 2XM.

Personal life

Monaghan has documented her experience being an expat from Ireland now relocated in London; including her experience rediscovering the Irish language while encountering a Learn Gaelic programme on the BBC.

Career

Monaghan presents her radio show from her home in London.  She currently works for a media company based in the United Kingdom.

Blogging

In July 2015, Monaghan recorded her "cringe-worthy" experience when a wheelchair user was refused access to a double decker bus because the passenger failed to book a seat in advance of the fare. The incident received exposure and coverage from media outlets nationwide in Ireland.

References

Living people
RTÉ 2fm presenters
Irish women radio presenters
Year of birth missing (living people)